Grenville Temple Emmet (August 2, 1877 – September 26, 1937) was an American attorney and diplomat. He practiced law with Franklin D. Roosevelt and served as United States Ambassador to the Netherlands and Austria.

Early life
Emmet was born in New Rochelle, New York on August 2, 1877. He was the son of Richard Stockton Emmet Sr. (1820–1902) and Katherine (née Temple) Emmet.  Among his siblings were older brothers William Temple Emmet and Republican New York State Assemblyman Richard S. Emmet Jr., and sisters Katherine Temple Emmet (wife of New York Supreme Court Justice Martin J. Keogh), Elizabeth LeRoy Emmet (wife of Nicholas Biddle) and Eleanor Emmet (wife of John Willard Lapsley).

His paternal grandparents were Robert Emmet, a New York Judge of Courts, and Rosina (née Hubley) Emmet. Among his extended family was first cousins Ellen Emmet Rand, Lydia Field Emmet, Rosina Emmet Sherwood, Jane Emmet de Glehn (wife of Wilfrid de Glehn), William LeRoy Emmet, Devereux Emmet, and Robert Temple Emmet, and great-grandfather, New York Attorney General Thomas Addis Emmet, a senior member of the United Irishmen before being exiled to America.

He was educated at St. Paul's School in Concord, New Hampshire, and received his Bachelor of Arts degree from Harvard University in 1898.

Career

Following his graduation from Harvard, Emmet joined the New York National Guard's 69th Infantry Regiment in 1898 as a Second Lieutenant. He remained with the unit when it was federalized for service in the Spanish–American War. Emmet was promoted to First Lieutenant and appointed as the regiment's adjutant. He continued to serve in the National Guard, and remained active in veterans organizations.

In 1901, Emmet received his law degree from New York Law School. After attaining admission to the bar in June 1901, he entered his father's law firm, Emmet & Robinson, where he became a partner in 1903.  He later practiced in partnership with Langdon Marvin and Franklin Roosevelt at Emmet, Marvin & Roosevelt, a firm first founded by his great-grandfather Thomas Addis Emmet in 1805.  Roosevelt, as junior partner, practiced with Emmet at various times in his career, including during Roosevelt's run for vice-president in 1920. Roosevelt left the firm in 1923, which continued to operate as Emmet, Marvin & Martin.

Diplomatic career
After his Roosevelt became president on March 4, 1933, Emmet was rumored to be considered for various diplomatic posts, including U.S. Ambassador to Italy, then Minister to Portugal or Hungary, which he reportedly declined, and then as "Ambassador to Germany or Minister to Austria because of his familiarity with Central European politics."

On December 27, 1933, Roosevelt named Emmet, a fellow Democrat, as the U.S. Minister to the Netherlands.  Emmet did not serve under this appointment however as he was commissioned during a recess of the U.S. Senate, and was reappointed by Roosevelt on January 15, 1934 to succeed Laurits S. Swenson (appointed by President Herbert Hoover).  He presented his credentials on March 21, 1934 and served as U.S. Minister until he left his post on August 21, 1937.

Following U.S. Minister George S. Messersmith's appointment as Assistant Secretary of State under Secretary Cordell Hull in 1937, Roosevelt nominated Emmet to succeed Messersmith as the U.S. Minister to Austria on July 13, 1937.  Emmet, who was ill with pneumonia when he arrived in Austria, presented his credentials to President Wilhelm Miklas in Vienna on September 14, 1937 but only served less than two weeks in this role until his death on September 26, 1937.

Personal life
On September 18, 1905, Emmet was married to Pauline Annie Ferguson (1879–1947), the daughter of New York born Paul Dudley Ferguson, the co-founder and treasurer of Gordon & Ferguson from St. Paul, Minnesota. Together, they lived at 39 East 63rd Street and, later, 3 East 94th Street in Manhattan (both designed by noted architect Mott B. Schmidt), and between November 1913 and October 1919, owned Bonito, a mansion and estate overlooking the Atlantic Ocean located at 466 Gin Lane in Southampton, New York.  Pauline and Grenville were the parents of:

 Pauline Temple Emmet (1906–1989), who died unmarried.
 Grenville Temple Emmet Jr. (1909–1989), who married Anne Livingston Eustis (1915–1989), daughter of William Corcoran Eustis (and granddaughter of U.S. Vice President Levi P. Morton), in 1937. He later married Elizabeth Chace (1911–2013) in 1973.
 Elizabeth Patricia Emmet (1918–1959), who died unmarried.

He was a member of the Racquet and Tennis Club, the Downtown Club, the Knickerbocker Club, the Harvard Club of New York and the Bedford Golf and Tennis Club and the New York City Bar Association.

Emmet died in Vienna's Hotel Bristol on September 26, 1937.  After a funeral at the English Church in Vienna, he was buried at Saint Matthew's Episcopal Church in Bedford, New York.

References

External resources
 Grenville Temple Emmet biography at the Office of the Historian, U.S. Department of State
 

1877 births
1937 deaths
Lawyers from New Rochelle, New York
St. Paul's School (New Hampshire) alumni
Harvard University alumni
New York Law School alumni
Franklin D. Roosevelt
New York (state) Democrats
New York (state) lawyers
American military personnel of the Spanish–American War
National Guard (United States) officers
Ambassadors of the United States to the Netherlands
Ambassadors of the United States to Austria
Deaths from pneumonia in Austria